Krutets is a rural locality (a village) in Andreyevskoye Rural Settlement, Alexandrovsky District, Vladimir Oblast, Russia. The population was 61 as of 2010. There are 8 streets.

Geography 
Krutets is located on the bank of the Seraya River, 7 km southeast of Alexandrov (the district's administrative centre) by road. Novinki is the nearest rural locality.

References 

Rural localities in Alexandrovsky District, Vladimir Oblast